Samantha Stosur and Zhang Shuai defeated the defending champions Tímea Babos and Kristina Mladenovic in the final, 6–3, 6–4 to win the women's doubles tennis title at the 2019 Australian Open.

Ekaterina Makarova was attempting to complete the Career Super Slam in doubles, partnered with Lucie Hradecká, but lost to Irina Bara and Monica Niculescu in the second round.

Kateřina Siniaková retained the WTA no. 1 doubles ranking after reaching the third round with Barbora Krejčíková. Barbora Strýcová was also in contention for the top ranking at the start of the tournament.

Seeds

Draw

Finals

Top half

Section 1

Section 2

Bottom half

Section 3

Section 4

Other entry information

Wild cards
  Destanee Aiava /  Naiktha Bains 
  Alison Bai /  Zoe Hives
  Lizette Cabrera /  Jaimee Fourlis
  Kimberly Birrell /  Priscilla Hon
  Astra Sharma /  Isabelle Wallace
  Ellen Perez /  Arina Rodionova 
  Chang Kai-chen /  Hsu Ching-wen

Protected ranking
  Alexandra Panova /  Laura Siegemund

References

External links
Draw
 2019 Australian Open – Women's draws and results at the International Tennis Federation

Women's Doubles
Australian Open (tennis) by year – Women's doubles
Australian Open – Women's Doubles
Australian Open – Women's Doubles
Australian Open – Women's Doubles